The  was the third season of the Japan Football League, the third tier of the Japanese football league system.

Overview 

It was contested by 16 teams, and Honda Motors won the championship. No promotion or relegation took place due to the promotion-eligible teams not being autonomous clubs fit for the J. League, and at the other end of the table, due to the expansion of the league from 16 to 18 teams.

Table

Results

Top scorers

Attendances

Promotion and relegation 
No relegation has occurred due to expansion of the league to 18 teams. At the end of the season, the winner and runner-up of the Regional League promotion series, Sagawa Express Osaka and Profesor Miyazaki were promoted automatically.

References 

2001
3